Medical Explorers was a Canadian historical television series which aired on CBC Television in 1973.

Premise
This Vancouver-produced series featured biographical sketches of contributors to the field of medicine. Episodes featured such personalities as Leonardo da Vinci, William Harvey (circulatory system), Joseph Lister and Edward Jenner (smallpox vaccine developers), Florence Nightingale, William Osler, Charles Sheffington (neurology), Frank Wesbrook (ambulance inventor) and Christopher Wren. The series was presented by William Gibson of University of British Columbia and curator of Woodward Medical Library.

Scheduling
This half-hour series was broadcast on Sundays at 4:30 p.m. (Eastern) from 7 January to 17 June 1973.

References

External links
 

CBC Television original programming
1973 Canadian television series debuts
1973 Canadian television series endings